Abdelkader Bengrina (born 1 January 1962) is an Algerian politician from the National Construction Movement who was the party's candidate in the December 2019 Algerian presidential election.

Positions held
 2002–2007: Member of the Wilaya of Algiers
 1997–1999: Minister of Tourism and Handicrafts
 1994–1997: Member of the National Transitional Council

References

1962 births
2019–2021 Algerian protests
21st-century Algerian politicians
Government ministers of Algeria
Living people
Members of the People's National Assembly
University of Batna alumni